The following lists events that happened during 1961 in Australia.

Incumbents

Monarch – Elizabeth II
Prime Minister –  Robert Menzies
Governor General – William Morrison, 1st Viscount Dunrossil (died in office 3 February), then William Sidney, 1st Viscount De L'Isle
Chief Justice – Sir Owen Dixon

State Premiers
Premier of New South Wales – Robert Heffron
Premier of Queensland – Frank Nicklin
Premier of South Australia – Sir Thomas Playford
Premier of Tasmania – Eric Reece
Premier of Western Australia – David Brand
Premier of Victoria – Henry Bolte

State Governors
Governor of New South Wales – Sir Eric Woodward
Governor of Queensland – Sir Henry Abel Smith
Governor of South Australia – Sir Edric Bastyan (from 4 April)
Governor of Tasmania – Thomas Corbett, 2nd Baron Rowallan
Governor of Western Australia – Sir Charles Gairdner
Governor of Victoria – Sir Dallas Brooks

Events
 2 January – Oral contraceptives are first sold in Australia
 20 January to early March – Disastrous bushfires affect Western Australia, completely destroying a number of towns.
 25 February – Last electric tram service runs in Sydney
 23 June – Australia signed the Antarctic Treaty
 12 August – Richmond become the only team since 1922 to fail to score a goal in a VFL/AFL match.
 31 October – Parkes radiotelescope officially opened by the Governor General
 30 November – Ansett-ANA Flight 325, a Vickers Viscount aircraft, crashes into Botany Bay shortly after takeoff, killing all 15 on board

Arts and literature

 Dame Joan Sutherland is announced as Australian of the Year
 William Edwin Pidgeon wins the Archibald Prize
 The novel Lady Chatterley's Lover by D. H. Lawrence is banned from sale
 Riders in the Chariot by Patrick White is awarded the Miles Franklin Literary Award

Television
 19 August – Four Corners TV current affairs program first screened on ABC TV
1 December - The first regional television station is launched in Traralgon, Victoria, as GLV-10 Gippsland and Latrobe Valley (Television) Victoria.

Sport

 Cricket
 New South Wales wins the Sheffield Shield
 The Ashes: Australia defeats England 2-1 and retains The Ashes
 Football
 Brisbane Rugby League premiership: Norths defeated Valleys 29-5
 New South Wales Rugby League premiership: St. George defeated Western Suburbs 22-0
 South Australian National Football League premiership: won by West Adelaide
 Victorian Football League premiership: Hawthorn defeated Footscray 94-51
 Golf
 Australian Open: won by Frank Phillips
 Australian PGA Championship: won by Alan Murray (golfer)
 Horse Racing
 Summer Fair wins the Caulfield Cup
 Dhaulagiri wins the Cox Plate
 Magic Night wins the Golden Slipper
 Lord Fury wins the Melbourne Cup
 Motor Racing
 The Australian Grand Prix was held at Mallala and won by Lex Davison driving a Cooper Climax
 Tennis
 Australian Open men's singles: Roy Emerson defeats Rod Laver 1–6, 6–3, 7–5, 6–4
 Australian Open women's singles: Margaret Court defeats Jan Lehane O'Neill 6–1, 6–4
 Davis Cup: Australia defeats Italy 5–0 in the 1961 Davis Cup final
 Wimbledon: Roy Emerson and Neale Fraser win the Men's Doubles
 Wimbledon: Rod Laver wins the Men's Singles
 Yachting
 Astor takes line honours and Rival wins on handicap in the Sydney to Hobart Yacht Race

Births
 1 January – Sam Backo, Indigenous Australian rugby league footballer
 7 January – Andrew Thomson, lawyer and politician
 9 February – Alison Megarrity, politician
 12 February – Di Farmer, politician
 25 February – Trevor Strong, politician
 4 March – Bart Bassett, politician
 14 March – Garry Jack, rugby league footballer and coach
 16 March – Brett Kenny, rugby league footballer
 24 March – Dean Jones, cricketer, coach and commentator (died 2020)
 26 March – Richard Torbay, politician
 12 April
Magda Szubanski, actor and comedian
Lisa Gerrard, singer
 20 April – Frances Adamson, Australian public servant and diplomat, Australian Ambassador to China
 16 May – Gina Riley, actor and comedian
 31 May – Justin Madden, Australian rules footballer
 16 June – Peter Sterling, rugby league footballer
 6 July - Rick Price, singer
 21 July – Morris Iemma, 40th Premier of New South Wales
 8 August – Tim Mander, politician and rugby league referee
 12 August – Peter Dowling, politician
 19 August – Frank Terenzini, politician
 15 September
 Terry Lamb, rugby league footballer and coach
 Joan Pease, politician
 8 October – Simon Burke, actor
 19 October – Cliff Lyons, rugby league footballer
 18 November – Anthony Warlow, entertainer
 23 November – Merv Hughes, cricketer
 4 December – Sonia Hornery, politician
 17 December – Larry Anthony, politician
 29 December – Mal Brough, politician

Deaths
 3 January – Auvergne Doherty, Australian businesswoman (born 1896)
 3 February – William Morrison (born 1893), Governor General of Australia
 20 February – Percy Grainger (born 1882), pianist and composer
 22 May – Lionel Lindsay (born 1874), artist
 27 September – Peter Dawson (born 1882), singer
 3 December – Pat O'Hara Wood (born 1891), tennis player
 20 December – Earle Page (born 1880), Prime Minister of Australia

See also
 List of Australian films of the 1960s

References

 
Australia
Years of the 20th century in Australia